The Organization Development Journal is a peer reviewed journal (ISSN 0889-6402) of 100-140 pages, published four times a year in the United States on organization development and work psychology. The current editor is Dr. Joanne C. Preston., It is published through The International Society for Organization Development (ISOD). The ISOD gratefully acknowledges that it began as the Organization Development Institute which was founded by Dr. Don W. Cole in the 1970s. The Organization Development Institute was sunset in late 2010 and gave rise in 2011 to The ISOD.

References

https://isodc.org/page-1763455

External links
 Organization Development Journal

Organizational psychology journals